⊖ is the Unicode character "circled minus" (U+2296).
⊖ is also known as the Plimsoll symbol.
⊖ may refer to:
 Symmetric difference, the set of elements which are in either of two sets but not in their intersection
 Erosion (morphology), one of the fundamental operations in morphological image processing
 A function for reversal and rotation in the APL programming language
 Symbol for the Escape character in ISO 2047
 Used to designate a thermodynamic quantity in the Standard state in chemistry
 Part of the notation for Standard enthalpy of reaction, as in ΔH⊖reaction

See also
Celtic cross
Coptic cross
Cross symbol
Ø (disambiguation)
⊗
⊕ (disambiguation)
𐃏
 ⴲ (U+2D32, tifinagh letter yabh)
 ⦵ (U+29B5, CIRCLE WITH HORIZONTAL BAR)